Abderrahim Makran (born 11 June 1995 in Nador) is a Moroccan professional footballer who currently plays as a forward for FUS.

International career

International goals
Scores and results list Morocco's goal tally first.

References

Living people
1995 births
Morocco international footballers
Moroccan footballers
Association football forwards
People from Nador
Botola players
Chabab Rif Al Hoceima players
Fath Union Sport players
Association Salé players
Moroccan expatriate footballers
Moroccan expatriate sportspeople in the United Arab Emirates
Expatriate footballers in the United Arab Emirates
Al-Ittihad Kalba SC players
UAE First Division League players